was a Japanese government bureaucrat. He was appointed governor of Fukui Prefecture and was the Chief of Internal Affairs for the Governor-General of Taiwan.

Biography
He graduated from High School No. 2 in Sendai-ku (now part of Sendai) in Miyagi Prefecture.

He graduated in 1912 from Tokyo Imperial University with degrees in law and economics and was appointed to the Home Ministry office in Toyama Prefecture. In November 1913, he passed with high marks the civil official exam for department administration. He was appointed the county administrator for Himi-gun in Toyama Prefecture in 1914. Several additional appoints followed: Prefectural Director for Hiroshima Prefecture, Prefectural Director for Hyougo Prefecture, Section Chief of the Health and Insurance Board in the Home Ministry, city welfare bureau chief, and other similar positions.

Obama was appointed Governor of Fukui Prefecture, serving from May 25, 1928, until August 26, 1930. He was preceded as Governor by Keizō Ichimura and was succeeded by Naokitsu Tachibana. He did not hold any public office between August 1930 and March 1932. He became the Chief of Internal Affairs for the Governor-General of Taiwan in March 1932, and held that office until October 1936. He retired from public office that same year.

He died on September 24, 1948.

Notes

References

1886 births
1948 deaths
Governors of Fukui Prefecture
Political office-holders in Taiwan
Politicians from Tokyo